Svend Aage Eriksen (12 August 1908 – 23 June 1989) was a Danish footballer. He played in five matches for the Denmark national football team from 1928 to 1933.

References

External links
 

1908 births
1989 deaths
Danish men's footballers
Denmark international footballers
People from Guldborgsund Municipality
Association football forwards